The 1982 Austrian Grand Prix was a Formula One motor race held at Österreichring on 15 August 1982. It was the thirteenth race of the 1982 Formula One World Championship.

The 53-lap race was won by Italian driver Elio de Angelis, driving a Lotus-Ford. De Angelis held off Finland's Keke Rosberg in the Williams-Ford to win by just 0.05 seconds, or less than half a car length, claiming the first victory for Lotus since the 1978 Dutch Grand Prix and the last in the lifetime of team founder Colin Chapman, who died at the end of 1982. Frenchman Jacques Laffite finished third in a Ligier-Matra, one lap behind.

Report 
A chicane had been added at the entrance to the pits earlier in the year. Nelson Piquet's Brabham led into the first corner from pole position, while Renault's Alain Prost passed Piquet's team-mate Riccardo Patrese for second. Further back, there was a collision which eliminated the two Alfa Romeos of Andrea de Cesaris and Bruno Giacomelli, as well as the Williams of Derek Daly. Prost's advantage over Patrese lasted only a few corners before the Italian re-passed him. On lap 2, Patrick Tambay punctured the right rear tyre on his Ferrari, Michele Alboreto crashed his Tyrrell at the Bosch Kurve, Patrese took the lead from Piquet and the two Brabhams immediately began to pull away on their half-full tanks.

Shortly before half distance, Piquet made the first planned mid-race fuel and tyre pit stop in modern F1 history. He rejoined in fourth place, behind Prost and Elio de Angelis, and just ahead of Keke Rosberg. Shortly afterwards, Patrese made his stop, having built up a sufficient lead to rejoin the race still in first place. However, the Italian suffered an engine failure three laps later, leaving Prost to inherit a comfortable lead from de Angelis.

Piquet was back up to third but was now in trouble, unable to make any inroads into the leaders and struggling to stay ahead of Rosberg. On lap 32, the Brazilian retired with an electrical failure. Free of the Brabham, Rosberg began closing in on de Angelis, who at this point was ten seconds ahead.

Prost was leading by half a minute when on lap 49, five from the end, his Renault suffered a mechanical failure. This left de Angelis and Rosberg – neither of whom had won a Grand Prix before – battling for the lead. At the start of the last lap de Angelis was 1.6 seconds ahead. Rosberg closed rapidly on the final tour and was right on the Lotus's gearbox heading into the final corner, the Rindt Kurve. De Angelis calmly defended the inside line, but slid wide on the exit of the corner. Rosberg dived inside on the home straight, only to come up short by 0.050 seconds, or less than half a car length.

De Angelis joyfully celebrated his maiden win, while Rosberg had nonetheless boosted his Driver's Championship chances, moving into second place ahead of John Watson, who had suffered an engine failure. Ligier's Jacques Laffite completed the podium, coming home a lap down, while Patrick Tambay was fourth in the sole Ferrari, having recovered from a puncture early in the race. Watson's McLaren team-mate Niki Lauda was fifth, with Mauro Baldi taking the final point in his Arrows.

This was the 150th World Championship race victory for the Cosworth DFV engine. However, it was also to be the last hailed by Colin Chapman's famous act of throwing his cloth cap into the air after a Lotus victory, as Chapman would die four months later. It was also the last win by a Chapman-built Lotus, and the team's last win until the 1985 Portuguese Grand Prix.

Classification

Qualifying

Race

Championship standings after the race

Drivers' Championship standings

Constructors' Championship standings

References

Austrian Grand Prix
Grand Prix
Austrian Grand Prix
Austrian Grand Prix